The Grob G 520 is a turboprop long-endurance, high-altitude reconnaissance and surveillance aircraft built by Grob Aircraft with short runway capabilities and full approval for all-weather IFR/icing operations according to LBA/FAA Part 23 regulations. Developed and certified in 1991, the Grob G 520 is one of the world's largest fully composite manned aircraft and holder of several world records. Production was resumed in 2014.

Development 

The Grob G 520 ‘EGRETT’ (former Grob/E-Systems/AlliedSignal Egrett – its name is derived from the three companies involved in its design: E-Systems, Grob Aircraft, and Garrett, the latter firm later changing its name to AlliedSignal) is a surveillance aircraft developed in Germany in the 1980s by an international partnership. It was intended to fill a joint German Air Force – US Air Force requirement for a high-altitude, long-duration surveillance platform for treaty verification and environmental monitoring. Known as "LAPAS" (Luftgestütztes, abstandsfähiges Primär-Aufklärungssystem, engl: airborne, long distance primary reconnaissance system) in Germany and "Senior Guardian" in the US, the program initially attempted to acquire the Lockheed TR-1 (U-2) for this role, but when this did not succeed, a new aircraft was sought.

The initial D-450 EGRETT I development aircraft flew in 1987 and established three world records for altitude and time to climb in September 1988: 
Time to climb to : 40 minutes 47 seconds
Altitude in horizontal flight: 
Altitude without payload: 

Two pre-production machines followed in 1989 and 1990 as the D-500 EGRETT II and then fitted out to the finalized G 520 design in 1991. These latter two aircraft were owned by E-Systems and Grob respectively, and used for promotional purposes: E-Systems' for various sensor packages, and Grob's (renamed the Strato 1) to market the design to civil authorities as a resource management platform.

In 1992, the German Air Force placed an order for production of nine EGRETT IIs, to be supplemented by G 520T two-seat trainer and one of the demonstrators. However, in February 1993, before much production had taken place, the process of procurement came under scrutiny when accusations of corruption (Amigo Affair) surrounding the former Bavarian Minister President Max Streibl became public. The program was subsequently cancelled when Eastern Europe ceased to be perceived as a threat.

The two-seater-version G 520T was completed and sold to Airborne Research Australia in Adelaide. In 2014, Grob Aircraft repurchased the G 520T and flew it back to Germany. The repainted aircraft will be presented to the public during the Farnborough Airshow 2014, simultaneously as kick-off for resuming the production of the G 520T.

It was the first composite aircraft specifically designed for stratospheric research.

Design 

The G 520 is a fully composite conventional mid-wing monoplane with extremely high aspect ratio wings. Power is provided by a single turboprop Honeywell TPE 331-14F with a 4-blade Hartzell propeller, and it is equipped with a tricycle undercarriage, whose main units retract into fairings on the wings.
The flexible payload-bay concept of the G 520 can accommodate multiple mission systems for both civilian and military applications and 12 payload compartments for up to 850 kg of mission equipment make the G 520 an ideal multi-role platform for a wide range of missions.
The cockpit of the G 520T provides room for a pilot and a sensor operator as well as for equipment which has to be placed inside the pressurized cabin.
The instrument panel can be optionally equipped with a digital glass cockpit IDU-680 EFIS by Genesys Aerosystems.

Variants

G 520T
The G 520T is a two-seater version of the G 520. Initially planned for training and demonstration purposes, the only ever built G 520T was repurchased by Grob Aircraft in 2014 and transferred to Germany in June 2014.
The production of the G 520T will be resumed in 2014.

G 520NG
The G 520NG will be the revised production version of the initial G 520T. According to company statements during Farnborough Airshow 2014 deliveries can start in 2016.

Operational history

Airborne Research Australia

Operators

Perlan Project High altitude glider towing

Specifications

References

Notes

Bibliography

External links

 G 520 official website
 Grob Aircraft official website

1980s international military reconnaissance aircraft
Grob aircraft
Single-engined tractor aircraft
Single-engined turboprop aircraft
Mid-wing aircraft
Aircraft first flown in 1987